Silas Mead (16 August 1834 – 13 September 1909) was an English Baptist minister remembered for founding the Flinders Street Baptist Church in Adelaide, South Australia, and for the missionary work in India which he inspired.

History
Mead was born in Curry Mallet, Somerset, England, the youngest son of farmers Thomas and Honor Mead, née Uttermare.
He was baptized at age 15 and helped local Baptists build a chapel, where he conducted services as a lay preacher.
He attended night school at nearby Taunton, then entered Stepney College, where he graduated BA. in 1857.
He then studied philosophy, theology and law at the Dissenters' Regent's Park College, where he graduated MA. in 1859 and LL.B. in 1860.
He took further studies at the University of London aiming for a doctorate of divinity, but was frustrated by their inability to grant such a degree.

Mead applied for a position with the Baptist Missionary Society but was rejected.
Meanwhile George Fife Angas wrote to Regent's Park College seeking candidates for a Baptist ministry in Adelaide. Mead accepted and arrived in South Australia aboard Parisian in July 1861. He began taking regular services at White's Rooms and soon his enthusiastic congregation decided to build a large church costing £7000 in Flinders Street, which was opened on 19 May 1863. The debt was cleared the following year, and the church established a mission in Furreedpore, India, and encouraged Baptist churches in the other Australian colonies to establish similar missions.

By 1871 Mead had 410 active members and the Flinders Street Church became the centre of the South Australian Baptist Union, of which Mead served as president three times and hon. secretary four times.
He founded the South Australian chapter of Christian Endeavour and was in 1897 president of the Australasian Christian Endeavour Union.
 He founded the Australian Baptist Missionary Society in 1864 and sent out the first missionary, Ellen Arnold, from his church in 1882
He served as president of the Adelaide YMCA in 1893.
He helped found Union College (later Parkin College) for training ministers of three denominations: Baptist, Congregational and Presbyterian.

He returned to England in 1897 to take up a position as principal of Henry Grattan Guinness's Harley College, London, preaching his last sermon at the Flinders Street Church on 10 January.

He resigned in 1901 and returned to Australia to join his son-in-law, Rev. A. S. Wilson as co-pastor of the Baptist Church in Museum Street, Perth. When Wilson moved to New Zealand, Mead lived with his daughter Dr. Gertrude Mead (1867–1919).

He died in Perth and was buried at the Baptist cemetery, Karrakatta.

Family
Mead married Anne "Annie" Staple ( – 15 June 1874) at Gumeracha on 25 May 1864; she died of typhoid fever aged 35. They had five children:
Lilian Staple Mead (30 June 1865 – unknown ) married Crosbie Brown on 16 August 1900. She assisted her father in promoting Christian Endeavour
Dr. Cecil Silas Mead (18 October 1866 – June 1940) graduated B.A., 1887; M.B., B.S., 1891 at the University of Adelaide, served as a medical missionary in eastern Bengal for twenty-nine years, returned to Adelaide to teach anatomy in 1923–1939.
Dr. Gertrude Ella Mead (31 December 1867 – 6 November 1919)
Annie Blanche Mead (8 January 1870 – 9 June 1961) married Rev. Alfred Samuel Wilson in 1896
Flora Beatrice Mead (20 January 1873 – 9 September 1886) died of typhoid fever
He married again, to the widow Mary Leighton (c. 1835 – 21 March 1886) at Flinders Street on 22 October 1878.  He had no further children.

Sources

Further reading

References 

19th-century Australian Baptist ministers
1834 births
1909 deaths
English emigrants to colonial Australia
YMCA leaders
People from Somerset
Alumni of Regent's Park College, Oxford
Burials at Karrakatta Cemetery